Alice of France (July/August 1150 – 1197/1198) was countess consort of Blois by marriage to Theobald V, Count of Blois. She was regent of Blois during the absence of her spouse in 1190-1191, and regent during the minority of Louis I, Count of Blois from 1191 until 1197.

Life 
Alix was the second daughter born to King Louis VII of France and Duchess Eleanor of Aquitaine, and was named after her aunt Petronilla of Aquitaine, who was also called "Alix". The birth of a second daughter to Eleanor and Louis instead of a badly needed son was one of the final nails in the coffin of their marriage.  Her parents' marriage was annulled in 1152, barely a year after Alix's birth. She and her sister, Marie, were declared legitimate, and the custody of the two girls was awarded to their father. Eleanor soon after left the French court and married Henry II, Duke of Normandy, who later became King of England.

Countess of Blois 
In 1164, Alix married Theobald V, Count of Blois, who had previously attempted to abduct Alix's mother to force her into a marriage with him. Her older sister, Marie, married Theobald's brother, Henry.

Alix served as regent of Blois for seven years. When her husband left for the East in 1190, she was appointed regent to serve during his absence. When he died in 1191 and was succeeded by their minor son, Alix continued to serve as regent, this time during the minority of her son Louis I. She governed until 1197.  

Alix died in 1197/98.

Issue
Alice and Theobald had seven children:
 Theobald (d. 1187)
 Louis I, Count of Blois 
 Henry (d. 1185)
 Philip (d. 1202)
 Margaret, Countess of Blois (d. aft. 1230), who married (1) Otto I, Count of Burgundy; (2) Gauthier II, Seigneur of Avesnes
 Isabelle of Chartres 
 Alice, Abbess of Fontevrault

References

Sources
 

1150 births
1190s deaths
12th-century French people
French princesses
House of Capet
Countesses of Chartres
12th-century women rulers
12th-century French women
Daughters of kings